Laigueglia is a town and comune in the province of Savona, in Liguria (northern Italy in 1812), nearby the Capo Mele Lighthouse.

International relations

Twin towns – Sister cities
Laigueglia is twinned with:
 Höhr-Grenzhausen, Germany (since 1972)
 Semur-en-Auxois, France (since 2000)
 La Thuile, Italy (since 2013)

Cities and towns in Liguria